The Pelena-1 (in Russian means "Shroud") is a Russian ground-based jamming system.

Designed for jamming the AN/APY-2 radar, the primary component of the airborne warning and control system (AWACS), by automatically inducing a jamming frequency on radar carrier frequencies operating in the fast frequency hopping mode. Pelena-1 disrupts the radar capability of detecting targets with RCS of up to 10 - 15 sq.m. The effective jamming range is up to 250 km.

Basic characteristics
Jamming sector: deg ±45
Probability of:
radar suppression: at least 0.8
system kill by antiradar missiles: up to 0.2
Scanning range, deg:
azimuth: 0 - 360
elevation: -1 to +25
Sector of automatic azimuth scanning, deg: 30; 60; 120
Power consumption: 80 kW
Crew: 7

References
 Russia's Arms Catalog 2004

Military electronics of Russia
Electronic warfare
Electronic warfare equipment